Omladinski košarkaški klub Dunav, commonly referred to as OKK Dunav, is a men's professional basketball club based in Stari Banovci, near Stara Pazova, Serbia. They are currently competing in the Basketball League of Serbia (KLS). The club is the league affiliate of Partizan NIS.

Nicknamed Alasi, the club was named after Danube, a river which passes near Stari Banovci.

History 
The club was founded in 1976 as KK Dunav. In early 2017, Dunav got qualified for the 2017 Radivoj Korać Cup. In the Cup tournament they lost to Partizan in the quarterfinals. In March 2017, the club changed its name to OKK Dunav. 

In August 2021, the club signed a contract on sports and technical cooperation with Adriatic League team Partizan. In November 2022, the club applied and declined subsequently participation in the 2022–23 season of the European North Basketball League (ENBL).

Players

Current roster

Coaches 

  Vuk Stanimirović (2010–2017)
  Mitar Ašćerić (2017–2021)
  Milivoje Lazić (2021–2022)
  Mitar Ašćerić (2022–present)

Trophies and awards

Trophies
 First Regional League, North Division (3rd-tier)
 Winners (1): 2014–15

Season-by-season

See also 
 FK Dunav Stari Banovci

References

External links
 

OKK Dunav
Basketball teams in Serbia
Basketball teams in Yugoslavia
Basketball teams established in 1976
1976 establishments in Yugoslavia
Stara Pazova